Prathikollanka is a village in Eluru district in the state of Andhra Pradesh in India. It is 22 km from the city of Eluru, the headquarters of West Godavari Dist.

Demographics
 census, Prathikollanka had a population of 3,479 of which 1,762 were males and 1,717 females. The average sex ratio was 974. The child population was 340 (9.77 % of the total) with a sex ratio 771. In 2011, the literacy rate of Prathikollanka was 64.35%, compared to 67.02% in Andhra Pradesh as a whole.

References

Villages in Eluru district